Romrod is a small town in the Vogelsbergkreis in central Hesse, Germany.

Geography

Location
Through the town flows the river Antrift.

Neighbouring communities
Romrod borders in the north on the town of Alsfeld, in the east on the community of Schwalmtal, in the south on the community of Feldatal, and in the west on the community of Gemünden and the town of Kirtorf.

Constituent communities
Romrod consists of the communities of Nieder-Breidenbach, Ober-Breidenbach, Romrod, Strebendorf and Zell.

History
The village of "Rumerode" came into being at the crossroads of the Diotweg ("People's Way") and the Kurze Hessen army road. The first castle was built in the 11th century in the Antrift valley. It is thus assumed that there was already a settlement there, as valley castles were often built in places where there were already people.

In the first half of the 12th century, the old castle with the moat was built. The builders of this castle were presumably the local von Romrod noble family's forebears. These nobles were first mentioned in writing in 1197, when Ludwig von Romrod's name cropped up when he witnessed a document from the Fulda Abbey. In the centuries that followed, the von Romrods held important offices. Heinrich von Romrod was a Hessian marshal and Hermann von Romrod held command over the Order of St. John in Grebenau. Also worthy of noting are the Abbots Heinrich VI von Romrod (1320 - 1323/1324) in Hersfeld and Friedrich I von Romrod (1383–1395) in Fulda.

Through the course of the 14th century, the von Romrods fell on hard times and had to sell their stately home to the Landgraves Otto and Heinrich von Hessen. By 1408 at the latest, Romrod had passed to Hesse.

Amalgamations
As part of municipal reforms, the new greater community of Romrod came into being on 31 December 1971 with the amalgamation of the town of Romrod and the communities of Nieder-Breidenbach, Ober-Breidenbach, Strebendorf and Zell.

Politics

Romrod town council is made up of 23 members. As of municipal elections held on 26 March 2006 the seats are apportioned thus:

The town executive consists of 5 councillors and the mayor.

The mayor, Dr. Birgit Richtberg was elected on 14 March 2004 with a 54.3% share of the vote.

Coat of arms
Heraldically, Romrod's civic coat of arms might be described thus: In Or a stone wall with a crenellated tower sable, below the tower and before the wall an inescutcheon, therein the Lion of Hesse (in azure a lion rampant striped nine times silver and gules, armed Or and langued gules).

The golden shield with the wall and tower has its roots in Romrod's old knightly family. The Lion of Hesse, of course, refers to Hesse, to which Romrod has belonged for centuries.

Town partnerships
  La Coquille, Dordogne, France since 1990

Culture and sightseeing

Buildings
 Schloss Romrod (stately home)
 Romrod Synagogue (from 1722)

Economy and infrastructure

Transport
Romrod lies on Autobahn A 5, at interchange 3, Pfefferhöhe. Furthermore, Federal Highway (Bundesstraße) B 49 runs through Romrod.

Public institutions
At the Schloss is a "memorial academy" educational centre of the Deutsche Stiftung Denkmalschutz, an initiative whose goal is to protect cultural monuments.

Sons and daughters of the town
August von Bibra (1808–1894), Manager of the Mainzer Adelsverein in Texas
Karl Follen, German-American academic and writer

References

Vogelsbergkreis
Grand Duchy of Hesse